Arnthor Birgisson (Icelandic: Arnþór Birgisson, born 12 February 1976 in Reykjavík, Iceland) is an Icelandic-Swedish songwriter and producer. Arnþór moved to Sweden in 1978 at age two and lives in Stockholm.

Information 
As young Arnþór attended Adolf Fredrik's Music School in Stockholm, Sweden. He began his professional songwriting and production career in 1996 working at Cosmos Studios together with Kent (Gillström) Isaacs and Bloodshy. In 1997, the founders of Murlyn Music, Anders Bagge and Christian Wåhlberg, saw the potential in Arnþór and Bloodshy, and handpicked them for the newly formed production company. Arnþór's breakthrough came a year later with the song "Because of You" written for 98 Degrees. Arnþór specifically desired to collaborate with Janet Jackson, saying "let's just say we will definitely be prepared if and when that happens." During his tenure at Murlyn Music (until 2003) a series of hits were created for artists such as Janet Jackson, Jessica Simpson, Ronan Keating, Jennifer Lopez, Samantha Mumba and Celine Dion.

Between 2003 and 2008, Arnþór worked at Maratone (formerly Cosmos Studios. During the years at Maratone, Arnþór created songs for Enrique Iglesias, Shayne Ward and Westlife, among others.

In 2005, Arnþór was awarded Best Pop Song at the BMI London Awards for Janet Jackson's "All Nite (Don't Stop)."

In 2008, Arnþór's song "Say OK", performed by Vanessa Hudgens, was awarded the prize for "This Year's Biggest American Pop Hit" at the BMI London Awards.

Arnþór has also worked with Sony BMG Music Entertainment, Universal Music, EMI Group and Warner Music Group.

In 2008 Arnþór founded the Swedish-based record and production company, Aristotracks, together with businessman Linus Andreen and artist Emilia de Poret. Since then he has written and produced songs for artists such as Britney Spears, Leona Lewis and Shontelle.

On 7 September, Arnþór won Popjustice's 2011 Twenty Quid Music Prize for "Song of the Year" with "Higher" by The Saturdays.

Arnþór worked with Aristotracks artist Kim Cesarion on his debut album Undressed. In mid-2011, Arnþór founded a band with Ina Wroldsen called Ask Embla.

Discography 

Selected songs written / co-written and produced
1998 – 98 Degrees "Because of You" – producer/co-writer
2000 – Samantha Mumba "Gotta Tell You" – producer/co-writer
2000 – Jennifer Lopez "Play" – producer/co-writer
2001 – Jessica Simpson "Irresistible" – producer/co-writer
2002 – Carlos Santana "Let Me Love You Tonight" – producer/co-writer
2003 – Celine Dion "Sorry for Love" – co-writer
2004 – Janet Jackson "All Nite (Don't Stop)" – producer/co-writer
2006 – Danity Kane "Stay with Me" – producer/co-writer
2006 – Shane Filan / Westlife "Beautiful in White" – co-writer
2007 – Westlife "Us Against the World" – producer/co-writer
2007 – Westlife "Something Right" – producer/co-writer
2007 – Westlife "The Easy Way" – producer/co-writer
2007 – Westlife "Pictures in My Head" – producer/co-writer
2007 – Vanessa Hudgens "Say OK" – producer/co-writer
2007 – Enrique Iglesias "Wish I Was Your Lover" – producer/co-writer
2007 – Shayne Ward "No U Hang Up" – co-producer/co-writer
2008 – Emilia de Poret "Pick Me Up" – producer/co-writer
2008 – Lisa Miskovsky "Still Alive" – producer/co-writer
2009 – Natalie Bassingthwaighte "Alive" – producer/co-writer
2009 – Leona Lewis "My Hands" – producer/co-writer
2010 – Shontelle "Impossible" – producer/co-writer
2012 – James Arthur "Impossible" – co-writer
2013 – Kim Cesarion "Undressed" – co-producer/co-writer
2015 – Tove Styrke "Ego" – co-writer

See also 

 List of Icelandic writers

References

External links 
Universal Music Publishing Group: Spotlight on Arnthor Birgisson
Discogs: Arnthor Birgisson page

Living people
Swedish record producers
Swedish songwriters
Arnthor Birgisson
1976 births
Arnthor Birgisson
Arnthor Birgisson